Yinzhi (12 March 1672 – 7 January 1735), also known as Yunzhi, formally known as Prince Zhi of the Second Rank between 1698 and 1708, was a Manchu prince of the Qing dynasty.

Life
Yinzhi was born in the Aisin Gioro clan as the fifth son of the Kangxi Emperor. His mother was Consort Hui (惠妃) from the Yehe Nara (葉赫那拉) clan as well as a relative of the eminent official, Mingju. As the Kangxi Emperor's first four sons died prematurely, and Yinzhi was the emperor's eldest son to survive into adulthood, he was designated by his father as "First Prince" (大阿哥). In 1698, he was granted a junwang (second-rank prince) title as "Prince Zhi of the Second Rank" (多羅直郡王).

Yinzhi participated in the Qing Empire's campaign against Galdan Boshugtu Khan of the Zunghar Khanate. In 1708, the Kangxi Emperor removed Yinreng from his position as Crown Prince. The emperor regarded Yinzhi highly so he placed Yinreng under Yinzhi's custody. Yinzhi had long harboured the intention of seizing the succession to the throne, so he used the opportunity to urge his father to execute Yinreng, but his father became extremely displeased. Later, Yinzhi's third brother, Yinzhi (胤祉), spread rumours accusing the First Prince of using sorcery to overthrow Yinreng from his Crown Prince position. The Kangxi Emperor believed the rumours and was so furious with Yinzhi (First Prince) that he called his son a "treacherous subject" and stripped him off his princely title and placed him under house arrest.

When the Kangxi Emperor died in 1722, his fourth son, Yinzhen, succeeded him and became historically known as the Yongzheng Emperor. Yinzhi changed his name to "Yunzhi" to avoid naming taboo because the Chinese character for "Yin" (胤) in "Yinzhi" is the same as the one in the Yongzheng Emperor's personal name "Yinzhen" (胤禛). Yunzhi died in 1735 and was given a funeral befitting that of a beizi.

Family 
Primary Consort

 First primary consort, of the Irgen Gioro clan (嫡福晉 伊爾根覺羅氏)
 Princess of the Third Rank (郡主; 29 October 1688 – July/August 1711), first daughter
 Married Duo'erjiseleng (多爾濟色稜) of the Khorchin in April/May 1706
 Princess of the Third Rank (郡主; 16 August 1689 – June/July 1716), second daughter
 Married Li Shu'ao (李淑鰲) in September/October 1707
 Lady of the Second Rank (縣君; 9 April 1691 – February/March 1723), third daughter
 Married Labutan (喇布坦) of the Kakai (喀凱) clan in April/May 1714
 Lady of the Second Rank (縣君; 1 September 1692 – March/April 1711), fourth daughter
 Married Sun Cheng'en (孫承恩) in February/March 1710
 Hongyu (弘昱; 25 October 1696 – 12 February 1718), first son

 Second primary consort, of the Zhang clan (嫡福晉 張氏)
 Hongwei (弘暐; 25 August 1705 – 17 April 1710), third son
 Hongyao (弘曜; 4 February 1707 – 8 May 1710), fourth son
 Eighth son (4 December 1710 – 23 July 1711)
 Lady of the Second Rank (縣君; 18 January 1713 – 11 October 1788), eighth daughter
 Married Luobocangdunduobo (羅蔔藏敦多卜) of the Khorchin Borjigit clan in November/December 1733

Concubine

 Mistress, of the Uya clan (烏雅氏)
 Lady of the Second Rank (縣君; 6 December 1703 – 19 May 1768), fifth daughter
 Married Sailengnamuzha'er (塞楞納穆扎爾) of the Khorchin in December 1722 or January 1723
 Tenth son (12 March 1716 – 16 June 1720)

 Mistress, of the Wang clan (王氏)
 Hongfang, Duke of the First Rank (鎮國公 弘昉; 10 September 1704 – 28 December 1772), second son

 Mistress, of the Guan clan (關氏)
 Fifth son (4 October 1709 – 5 March 1711)

 Mistress, of the Qian clan (錢氏)
 Honghan (弘晗; 19 December 1709 – 20 January 1755), sixth son

 Mistress, of the Ruan clan (阮氏)
 Hongdi (弘旳; 11 January 1710 – 28 July 1742), seventh son

 Mistress, of the Li clan (李氏)
 Sixth daughter (28 December 1710 – July/August 1714)

 Mistress, of the Chao clan (晁氏)
 Seventh daughter (14 January 1711 – December 1736)
 Married Laxi (拉錫) of the Aohan Borjigit clan in September/October 1734

 Mistress, of the Guo clan (郭氏)
 Lady of the Second Rank (縣君; 21 May 1715 – 6 December 1750), ninth daughter
 Married Ji'erdi (吉爾第) of the Khorchin Borjigit clan in November/December 1734
 Lady of the Second Rank (縣君; 14 August 1717 – 16 October 1755), tenth daughter
 Married Wangzha'er (汪扎爾) Aohan Borjigit clan in August/September 1733
 11th daughter (29 August 1721 – April/May 1722)
 12th daughter (11 May 1723 – 25 January 1725)
 Lady of the Second Rank (縣君; 22 September 1725 – 7 December 1751), 14th daughter
 Married Jilalida (吉喇里達) of the Khorchin Borjigit clan in January/February 1746

 Mistress, of the Guo clan (郭氏)
 Ninth son (15 October 1715 – 18 March 1720)
 Hongtong (弘晍; 30 June 1723 – 10 June 1760), 13th son

 Mistress, of the Jin clan (晉氏)
 11th son (8 July 1716 – 30 April 1719)
 Princess of the Third Rank (郡主; 6 August 1724 – 21 August 1793), 13th daughter
 Hongming (弘明; 5 April 1732 – 25 November 1806), 14th son

 Mistress, of the Gao clan (高氏)
 Hongxiang, General of the Fourth Rank (奉恩將軍 弘晌; 20 March 1718 – 8 April 1781), 12th son

 Mistress, of the Fan clan (范氏)
 Hongtun (弘旽; 18 November 1732 – 6 July 1805), 15th son

Ancestry

In fiction and popular culture
 Portrayed by Yang Xiaobo in Scarlet Heart (2011)

See also
 Prince Zhi (直)
 Royal and noble ranks of the Qing dynasty
 Ranks of imperial consorts in China#Qing

References
 
 

17th-century Chinese people
18th-century Chinese people
1672 births
1735 deaths
Kangxi Emperor's sons